Charles William Francis Henney (February 2, 1884 – November 16, 1969) was a member of the United States House of Representatives from Wisconsin from March 4, 1933, till January 3, 1935. He was a Democrat. He represented Wisconsin's 2nd congressional district in the 73rd United States Congress. He was also a presidential elector in 1948.

Biography
Born near Dunlap, Iowa, Henney went to the Denison Normal and Business College and then taught school in Crawford County, Iowa. He then received his degree in pharmacy from Norfolk Normal School and his medical degree from Northwestern University. Henney then practiced medicine in Chicago, Illinois and then Portage, Wisconsin. He died in Portage.

References

External links

1884 births
1969 deaths
Politicians from Chicago
People from Harrison County, Iowa
People from Portage, Wisconsin
Midland University alumni
Feinberg School of Medicine alumni
Physicians from Wisconsin
Democratic Party members of the United States House of Representatives from Wisconsin
People from Crawford County, Iowa
20th-century American politicians